Frederik Carstensen (born 9 April 2002) is a Danish professional footballer who plays as a right winger for FC Fredericia, on loan from Danish Superliga club Silkeborg IF.

Career

Silkeborg IF
Carstensen joined Silkeborg IF at the age of 12 from Virklund Boldklub. In November 2019, Carstensen signed a three-year contract extension with Silkeborg. In July 2020, he signed a new contract again, this time until June 2024.

Carstensen worked his way up through Silkeborg's youth sector and got his official debut for the club on 14 February 2021 against Hvidovre IF in the Danish 1st Division. He made one more appearance in the 1st Division, before he in April 2021 got a fatigue fracture in his foot, which kept him out until August 2021.

Silkeborg was promoted to the 2021-22 Danish Superliga. Carstensen got his debut in the highest football league in Denmark on 31 October 2021 against SønderjyskE. On 18 February 2022, Carstensen signed a new long-term deal with Silkeborg, until June 2026. On 30 August 2022, Carstensen was loaned out to Danish 1st Division side FC Fredericia until the end of the 2022-23 season.

Personal life
Frederik Carstensen's older brother, Rasmus Carstensen, is also a professional footballer.

References

External links

Frederik Carstensen at DBU

2002 births
Living people
Danish men's footballers
Association football wingers
Danish 1st Division players
Danish Superliga players
Silkeborg IF players
FC Fredericia players
Denmark youth international footballers